John Charles Sloley (13 September 1906 – 23 February 1996) was an Australian rules footballer who played with Footscray in the Victorian Football League (VFL).

Notes

External links 

1906 births
1996 deaths
Australian rules footballers from Victoria (Australia)
Western Bulldogs players
Port Melbourne Football Club players